The Karoo scrub robin (Cercotrichas coryphaeus) or Karoo robin is a species of bird in the family Muscicapidae. It is found in Lesotho, Namibia, and South Africa. Its natural habitats are dry shrubland and Mediterranean-type shrubby vegetation.

Description
It is 17 cm long and weighs 19 g. The upperparts are drab greyish brown; the face with a narrow, white supercilium above thin black eye-stripe. Partial whitish eye-ring below eye. Closed tail darker than rump and mantle. Upper wing coverts and flight feathers brown, underwing dull buffy brown. Bill black, eyes brown and legs as well as feet black.

Song calls vary between individuals, e.g. chip, swee-chipswirraree, seeep-seeep-treeeeyer, repeated 5 – 10 times.

Habitat
Favours bare ground beneath ca. 1 m high vegetation and can be found in the low shrublands of the Karoo and Namaqualand in South Africa, in drainage line woodland. Also occasionally seen among tall vegetation at the base of farm dam walls.

Foraging and food
Nearly all food taken on ground, while its diet consists mainly of insects, dominated by worker ants that it gleans from the ground surface, and also including termites, beetles, caterpillars, moths and small grasshoppers.

Breeding
Monogamous, generally solitary nester with pairs remaining on defended territory from year to year. The nests are open, often deep cups sunk into variably sized platforms or large twigs and lined with fine, dry grass, leaf fragments and moss. Between 2 and 4 oval eggs of aquamarine or turquoise colour with brown spots and blotches.

Races
Its populations are genetically highly structured. Three races are accepted.
 C. c. coryphaeus 
Habitat and range: Nama and Succulent Karoo, strandveld and thicket in arid savanna of western Lesotho, the southern Free State, Northern, Western and Eastern Cape, South Africa
Description: dark brown plumage
 C. c. abboti Friedman, 1932
Habitat and range: Desert and Karoo of southern Namibia and Northern Cape, South Africa
Description: more buffy (rather than rufous) on vent and undertail plumage than nominate
 C. c. cinerea (Macdonald, 1952)
Habitat and range: Strandveld and Succulent Karoo on sandy substrates along South Africa's western seafront
Description: greyish brown plumage below and paler above than nominate

References

 BirdLife International 2004.  Erythropygia coryphaeus.   2006 IUCN Red List of Threatened Species.   Downloaded on 25 July 2007.

External links
 Karoo (scrub) robin - Species text in The Atlas of Southern African Birds.

Karoo scrub robin
Birds of Southern Africa
Karoo scrub robin
Taxa named by Louis Jean Pierre Vieillot
Taxonomy articles created by Polbot